Security Service or security service may refer to:

Government 
 Security agency, a nation's institution for intelligence gathering
 List of security agencies (MI5, NSA, KGB, etc.)
  (SD), Nazi German agency which translates as "Security Service"
 MI5, also called the Security Service, the United Kingdom's counter-intelligence and security agency
 U.S. Air Force Security Service, a former designation of the US Air Force Intelligence, Surveillance and Reconnaissance Agency
 RCMP Security Service, the Royal Canadian Mounted Police's political intelligence branch
 Swedish Security Service
 Secret service, a government agency concerned with gathering intelligence data 
 Secret police, a police agency beyond the law to protect the political power of a dictator or regime

Other 
 Security service (telecommunication), security architecture for the interconnection of open systems
 Security and Intelligence Services (India)
 Private security company
 Private military company

See also
 Security Intelligence Service (disambiguation)